Three Regentesses of the Leprozenhuis of Amsterdam is a group portrait by Ferdinand Bol representing three regentesses of the leper colony of Amsterdam, painted c. 1668. The painting is held in the Rijksmuseum, in Amsterdam.

Sources
http://hdl.handle.net/10934/RM0001.COLLECT.6098

1668 paintings
Group portraits by Dutch artists
Portraits of women
Portraits by Ferdinand Bol
Paintings in the collection of the Rijksmuseum